Samoa participated in the 2012 Summer Paralympics in London, United Kingdom, from August 29 to September 9.

The country was represented by two athletes, both in track and field. They did not qualify for the Games and received a wild card invitation to compete. Sprinter Milo Toleafoa was the country's flag-bearer during the Games' opening ceremony. 

Samoa did not win a medal at these Games.

Athletics

Milo Toleafoa competed in the men's 400m T38 (cerebral palsy, with a comparatively low level of disability). Toleafoa is a T37 athlete, with a somewhat greater level of disability, but there was no specific T37 event in the 400 metres. Toleafoa was the flag bearer for the opening ceremonies. In heat 2, he finished fourth out of five, in 1:09.97 - almost fifteen seconds behind the top three athletes, but more than four seconds ahead of Timor-Leste's Filomeno Soares.

Leitu Viliamu competed in the women's shot put F42-44 (lower limb amputee). She is a T42 athlete, with a greater degree of disability than some of the other competitors, but this is factored into the scoring. Her best throw was 5.32 metres, earning her 257 points; she finished a distant sixth and last.

Men’s track and road events

Women’s field events

See also
Summer Paralympic disability classification
Samoa at the Paralympics
Samoa at the 2012 Summer Olympics

Notes

Nations at the 2012 Summer Paralympics
2012
Paralympics